The 1836 New York gubernatorial election was held from November 7 to 9, 1836, to elect the Governor and Lieutenant Governor of New York.

Candidates
The Democratic Party nominated incumbent Governor William L. Marcy. They nominated incumbent John Tracy for Lieutenant Governor.

The Whig Party nominated agricultural reformist Jesse Buel. They nominated former U.S. Representative Gamaliel H. Barstow for Lieutenant Governor.

The Locofoco Faction of the Democratic Party nominated Isaac S. Smith. They nominated Moses Jacques for Lieutenant Governor.

Results
The Democratic ticket of Marcy and Tracy was elected.

Sources
Result: The Tribune Almanac 1841

1836
New York
Gubernatorial election
November 1836 events